Gorm or GORM may refer to:
Gorm (computing), Graphical Object Relationship Modeller, a graphical interface builder application in the developer tools of GNUstep
Grails Object Relational Mapping (GORM), the persistence layer of the Grails framework